South Fork is a borough in Cambria County, Pennsylvania, United States. It is part of the Johnstown, Pennsylvania Metropolitan Statistical Area. The population was 928 at the 2010 census, down from 1,138 at the 2000 census.

Geography
South Fork is located in south-central Cambria County at  (40.365042, -78.790474), in the valley of the Little Conemaugh River at the confluence of its South Fork.

Demographics

As of the census of 2000, there were 1,138 people, 452 households, and 311 families residing in the borough. The population density was 2,208.1 people per square mile (845.0/km2). There were 484 housing units at an average density of 939.1 per square mile (359.4/km2). The racial makeup of the borough was 99.74% White, 0.09% African American, and 0.18% from two or more races. Hispanic or Latino of any race were 0.62% of the population.

There were 452 households, out of which 31.0% had children under the age of 18 living with them, 50.7% were married couples living together, 13.9% had a female householder with no husband present, and 31.0% were non-families. 29.0% of all households were made up of individuals, and 16.2% had someone living alone who was 65 years of age or older. The average household size was 2.50 and the average family size was 3.07.

In the borough the population was spread out, with 24.9% under the age of 18, 8.9% from 18 to 24, 27.9% from 25 to 44, 19.9% from 45 to 64, and 18.5% who were 65 years of age or older. The median age was 37 years. For every 100 females there were 97.9 males. For every 100 females age 18 and over, there were 93.0 males.

The median income for a household in the borough was $30,144, and the median income for a family was $34,531. Males had a median income of $25,375 versus $16,563 for females. The per capita income for the borough was $13,298. About 11.1% of families and 12.0% of the population were below the poverty line, including 21.8% of those under age 18 and 5.5% of those age 65 or over.

References

Populated places established in 1887
Boroughs in Cambria County, Pennsylvania
1887 establishments in Pennsylvania